Fanny Hünerwadel (26 January 1826 – 27 April 1854) was a Swiss pianist, singer and composer.

Life 
Hünerwadel was a native of Lenzburg and came from a long-established family of the city. She was the oldest child of the physician Johann Friedrich Hünerwadel and Speerli Regula, who were both avid music lovers. Hünerwadel was first taught music by her mother, and then studied piano under Philipp Tietz, Joseph Breitenbach and Ludwig Kurz. She also belonged to the local choral society.

In 1846 she began studied piano, voice, music theory and composition with Hans Nägeli and Alexander Müller (1808–1863) in Zurich. From 1849, she made public appearances as a singer and pianist, performing benefit concerts at the Universal Music Company in Zurich. She sang in 1851 to inaugurate the new Lenzburg organ. Also, in 1851 she visited Paris and London. In 1852, she played Rondo Brilliant by Johann Nepomuk Hummel in a subscription concert of the General Music Society of Zurich, from which today's Tonhalle Orchestra Zurich emerged.

In 1853 as part of her training, she traveled to Florence and Rome. In Florence, she took singing lessons with Romani. In Rome in 1853 she was guest of artists and families Corrodi Imhof and took lessons in singing teacher Parisotti. Hünerwadel died of typhoid on 27 April 1854 in Rome. Six of her seven existing piano songs were posthumously published in 1854.

Discography

MGB CD 6153: "Richard Wagner and his composer friends in Zurich". Songs "Morning Song" and "Spring" by Fanny Hünerwadel.

References

Further reading
In archives:
 Peter Mieg-Stiftung in Lenzburg (Teilnachlass)
 Introduction, Variations & Rondo, Klavierkomposition: im FMF (Frauen Musik Forum) in Bern.

Other:
 Biographisches Lexikon des Aargaus, 1803–1957, (1958): p. 371 f.
 Répertoire international des sources musicales / Internationales Quellenlexikon der Musik: Repertorium Schweizer Komponisten des 19. Jahrhunderts (in Vorbereitung).
 Werner Breig, Von Alexander Müller bis Richard Wagner und Franz Liszt: Das musikalische Album der Schweizer Sängerin, Pianistin und Komponistin Fanny Hünerwadel, in: Musikalische Quellen - Quellen zur Musikgeschichte. Festschrift für Martin Staehelin zum 65. Geburtstag, edited by Ulrich Konrad, Göttingen 2002, 
 Die Musik in Geschichte und Gegenwart, Personentl. 9, 22003, 529 f.
 Lenzburger Neujahrsblätter (diverse Jahrgänge)

External links

Two articles in the Bulletin of the Peter Mieg Foundation (June 1998) by Beat Hanselmann and Chris Walton
Information on the Peter Mieg Foundation
Sign on Klassika – die deutschsprachige Klassikerseite

1826 births
1854 deaths
Swiss classical pianists
Swiss women pianists
Women classical composers
People from Lenzburg
19th-century classical composers
19th-century classical pianists
Women classical pianists
19th-century women composers
19th-century women pianists